Felice Vecchione (born 22 January 1991) is an Italian-German footballer who played for Sonnenhof Großaspach.

External links
 

1991 births
Living people
German footballers
German sportspeople of Italian descent
VfB Stuttgart II players
SG Sonnenhof Großaspach players
3. Liga players
Association football midfielders
People from Waiblingen
Sportspeople from Stuttgart (region)
Footballers from Baden-Württemberg